Kiptanui is a surname of Kenyan origin meaning "son of Tanui". Kiptanui means someone who fainted after birth.

It may refer to:

Jackson Kiptanui, Kenyan politician and National Assembly Member for the Orange Democratic Movement
Eliud Kiptanui (born 1989), Kenyan marathon runner and 2010 Prague Marathon winner
Moses Kiptanui (born 1970), Kenyan steeplechaser and three-time world champion
Timothy Kiptanui (born 1980), Kenyan Olympic middle-distance runner

See also
Tanui, origin of name Kiptanui

Kalenjin names